Carpinus orientalis, known as the Oriental hornbeam, is a hornbeam native to Hungary, the Balkans, Italy, Crimea, Turkey, Iran, and the Caucasus. and occurs usually on hot dry sites at lower altitudes in comparison to the Carpinus betulus (European Hornbeam).

Description
The Carpinus orientalis is a small tree, rarely over 10 m tall and often shrubby. It has minute, with small leaves, 3–5 cm long.

The seeds have a simple bract, not trilobed like Carpinus betulus, that is about 2 cm long.

Cultivation
In recent years, this species has been extensively used as an ornamental tree for bonsai.

References

orientalis
Trees of Asia
Trees of Europe
Flora of the Caucasus
Flora of Southeastern Europe
Flora of Western Asia
Flora of Iran
Plants described in 1768
Garden plants of Asia
Garden plants of Europe
Ornamental trees
Plants used in bonsai
Trees of Mediterranean climate
Taxa named by Philip Miller